Cevdet Erek (born 1974) is a Turkish artist and musician. Cevdet Erek was the recipient of the Nam Jun Paik Award in 2012.

Education 
Erek studied architecture at Mimar Sinan University of Fine Arts, while working at various architectural practices as well as in the music band Nekropsi. He left the master's program he had started at MSU for Istanbul Technical University's Center for Advanced Studies in Music (MIAM), where he studied Sound Engineering and Design and worked as a research assistant from 2002 to 2011. Erek was an artist in residence at Rijksakademie in Amsterdam between 2005 and 2006.

Exhibitions 
Erek participated in dOCUMENTA (13)) in 2012 with "Raum der Rhythmen" [Room of Rhythms]. Volumes of the same study were shown as “A Room of Rhythms - Otopark” in the 14th Istanbul Biennial (2015) and as "Room of Rhythms - Curva" at MAXXI in Rome as part of the exhibition "Open Museum Open City]” (2014). Implementations of “Courtyard Ornamentation” series were shown in 11th Sharjah Biennial (2013), then in Marrakech Bienniale 5 (2014). "Rulers and Rhythm Studies" were presented in the Stedelijk Museum collection in Amsterdam as well as the 12th Istanbul Biennial and 7th Asia Pacific Triennial of Contemporary Art in Brisbane. Solo exhibitions of his work were organized by Spike Island in Bristol, UK, in 2014 and at the Kunsthalle Basel, Switzerland, in 2012.

Collaborations 
Erek was responsible for the sound and music direction for Kaan Müjdeci's feature-length film “Sivas” (71st Venice Film Festival - Special Jury Prize, 2014), and music and sound co-design (with Cenker Kökten) for Emin Alper's feature-length film “Abluka / Frenzy” (72nd Venice Film Festival - Special Jury Prize, 2015).

Erek designed and realised sound installations for Turkish novelist Orhan Pamuk's Museum of Innocence which was opened in Çukurcuma neighbourhood of Beyoğlu, Istanbul in 2011.

Books 
"Cevdet Erek - Less Empty Maybe / Az Boş Belki" was edited by Süreyyya Evren and published by Revolver in 2015, .

"Cevdet Erek - Room of Rhythms 1", based on a conversation by Cevdet Erek and editor Duygu Demir, was published by Verlag der Buchhandlung Walther Konig in 2012, . The publication surveys the research that led to Room of Rhythms, provides an insight into Cevdet Erek's practice as an artist, summing up the artistic research that led to "Room of Rhythms", an experiential installation presented at dOCUMENTA (13).

"SSS - Sahil Sahnesi Sesi / Shore Scene Soundtrack -Themes and Variations for Carpet" written by Cevdet Erek was released as a part of BENT 004 - Artists' Books by BAS in February 2008.

Teaching 
Cevdet Erek co-taught architectural design studio with Arda İnceoğlu at the School of Architecture at Istanbul Technical University between 2011 and 2013,[5] and is still offering sound and music related courses at the Conservatory of the same university, İTÜ TMDK[6].

References

External links 
 Official website
 Selection of sounds & videos of installations, accompanying the book Az Bos Belki / Less Empty Maybe
 Nekropsi website

Turkish contemporary artists
Turkish musicians
1974 births
Living people
Place of birth missing (living people)
Mimar Sinan Fine Arts University alumni
Istanbul Technical University alumni